The Saver is a Canadian drama film, written and directed by Wiebke von Carolsfeld, and released in 2015.

Based on a novel by Edeet Ravel, the film stars Imajyn Cardinal as Fern, a young girl who is determined to assert her independence after the death of her mother. Taking over her mother's work as a house cleaner, she finds a book on how to become a millionaire, and resolves to start saving her money.

The film's cast also includes Pascale Bussières, Alexandre Landry, Monia Chokri, Pascale Montpetit, Brandon Oakes and Hamidou Savadogo.

Von Carolsfeld garnered a Canadian Screen Award nomination for Best Adapted Screenplay at the 4th Canadian Screen Awards in 2016.

References

External links
 

2015 films
2015 drama films
Canadian drama films
English-language Canadian films
Films directed by Wiebke von Carolsfeld
Films based on Canadian novels
2010s English-language films
2010s Canadian films